Avur is a village in the Yardymli Rayon of Azerbaijan.  The village forms part of the municipality of Çay Üzü.

References 

Populated places in Yardimli District